Fernando de Valdés y Llanos (28 July 1575 – 1639) was the Archbishop of Granada from 1633 to 1639.

Biography

Fernando de Valdés y Llanos was born in Cangas de Tineo on July 28, 1575.  He was a member of the family of the Count of Toreno.

Valdés was appointed Bishop of Teruel on July 9, 1625, and consecrated as a bishop by Diego Guzmán de Haros, Archbishop of Seville, on November 16, 1625.  He was Bishop Elect of León in 1632, before being appointed Archbishop of Granada on July 18, 1633.  As Archbishop of Granada, he was president of the Council of Castile.

He died in 1639.

References

1575 births
1639 deaths
17th-century Roman Catholic archbishops in Spain
University of Salamanca alumni
Archbishops of Granada